Theories of consumption have been a part of the field of sociology since its earliest days, dating back, at least implicitly, to the work of Karl Marx in the mid-to-late nineteenth century. Sociologists view consumption as central to everyday life, identity and social order.  Many sociologists associate it with social class, identity, group membership, age and stratification as it plays a huge part in modernity. Thorstein Veblen's (1899) The Theory of the Leisure Class is generally seen as the first major theoretical work to take consumption as its primary focus. Despite these early roots, research on consumption began in earnest in the second half of the twentieth century in Europe, especially Great Britain. Interest in the topic among mainstream US sociologists was much slower to develop and it is still not a focal concern of many American sociologists. Efforts are currently underway to form a section in the American Sociological Association devoted to the study of consumption.

However, over the last twenty years, sociological research into the area of consumption has burgeoned in cognate fields, particularly in global and cultural studies:

Modern theorists of consumption include Jean Baudrillard, Pierre Bourdieu, and George Ritzer.

Definitions of Consumption 
The sociology of consumption is a field within sociology specifically about the social, economic, and cultural dimensions of consumer behavior. It studies how and why individuals and groups acquire and use goods and services in a given society, as well as the cultural meanings and social norms associated with these practices.

When defining consumption, there must be a focus on the consumer, their relationships, and the process of consumption itself. When considering the consumer’s role in consumption, there is an emphasis on the moment of exchange of a good or service as well as stressing the importance of considering the consumer as an individual within a socially constructed environment. The process of consumption itself takes into account how activities are socially constructed and organized. Other definitions of consumption necessitate a process that creates utility, agency, and appropriation (in the sense that a raw material is processed, handled, or transformed by humans). For instance, infants cannot consume because they lack agency; instead, their parents consume for them. An example of appropriation is purchasing a Christmas tree–although it is a natural object, it has been processed by others and therefore consumed by those who purchase it. On the other hand, if one were to go into their backyard, chop a fir themselves, and then bring it into the home, arguably, that is not an act of consumption.  

The academic debate surrounding definitions of consumption include whether or not consumption is an active choice or an action carried out simply due to habit or circumstance. Though individualism and identity is highly intertwined with practices of consumption, so are the economic conditions that obstruct agency for marginalized groups and individuals.  

In "Consumption, Food and Taste" (1997), sociologist Alan Warde defines consumption as "the process by which goods and services are acquired, used and disposed of by households and other economic actors" (p. 3). He emphasizes that consumption involves not just the physical act of purchasing and consuming goods, but also the cultural meanings and social norms that are associated with these practices, including economic conditions, new technologies, and cultural trends. Moreover, consumption has significant implications for social inequality, as patterns of consumption are often tied to broader patterns of social stratification.

History of Consumption 
Consumption patterns have a direct link to ways in which people interact with the environment. What people eat and wear, what types of homes people live in, and where people even buy groceries all have impacts on the environment. This immense stratification of impact has a long and rich history that has roots in the Industrial Revolution, imperialism, the World Wars, and much more especially as the global population has grown exponentially in recent centuries.

Pre-Industrial Revolution 

Before the Industrial Revolution, consumption looked very different. Around the world, consumption patterns revolved largely around what food could be grown and brought into the villages, towns, and cities of the day. Additionally, prior to the Industrial Revolution, the steam engine had yet to be invented and fossil fuels had yet to truly be revolutionizing. So, production was significantly limited to the fuel that could be found consisting of wood, peat, or possibly watermill power. Collectively, these limitations prohibited a majority of the global population from being able to consume in excess. Excess consumption was reserved for the global elites.

During the Industrial Revolution 
Starting during the Industrial Revolution, consumption patterns changed drastically around the world. For the countries getting industrialized first, cheap mass-produced goods combined with new steady and rising wages. People in countries like England, the United States, and France began to be able to buy more commodities with the more expendable income they had. This pattern only grew exponentially as time moved toward the present. In contrast to the individuals in industrializing countries, people in the colonies of the colonial industrializing powers became dumping grounds for the overproduction of commodities.

Subsequently, production overall grew exponentially as industrial production transitioned into the backbone of the global economy. Everyday people began having more things and more specifically, more uniform mass-produced things. As more and more people began having more and more things, the raw resources and the consequences of production grew as well. These production-based consequences include but are in no way limited to immense deforestation, overhunting of different animal populations (beaver hunting), and exploitative and destructive mining and resource extraction processes.

Post-Industrial Revolution 

From the time of the Industrial Revolution until World War II, there were significant differences in consumption patterns between those in the industrialized world and those in the unindustrialized world. Yet, those differences got exacerbated during World War II and in the immediate postwar years. Driven by the United States’ monumental industrial capacity, the world exited the Second World War with a new jump in industrialization and mass production. Consumption during World War II was altered globally due to so many resources going to the war effort. However, after the war, the factories still intact switched to consumer goods to avoid an economic slowdown. For the United States with all of its industrial capacity unharmed, the United States became an industrial titan producing mass-consumption goods for the whole world. Additionally through the Marshall Plan, an American foreign policy aid program aimed at preventing broken European nations from becoming Communist by supporting a capitalist revitalization with immense economic support from the United States, European nations rebuilt extremely quickly and were able to modernize their industrial systems toward mass production as well.

People all around the world, in every corner, in every nation, had American and Western European goods flowing in during the second half of the 20th century. The cheap Western goods enabled a new level of consumption where people could now have cheap American corn and Spam, cheap Ford cars, and American electronics. While people around the world were seeing the “Made in America” stamp more and more frequently, a mirrored impact is that Americans of all classes were becoming richer in comparison. This increase in wealth allowed for the increase in stratification between Americans and largely the rest of the world. Americans could now afford to consume gluttonous amounts of everything.

Divergence in American consumption vs European consumption 

When looking at American cities, they look remarkably different to cities around the world. These drastic differences have a lot of causes yet they all lead to cities that have on average significantly higher levels of per capita consumption than others around the world. Stemming largely from the post-World War II divergence, the United States built much of its prosperity on its national demand for mass-consumption goods whereas Europe built theirs largely around exports. This divergence is exhibited in how American and European cities function and look. Americans, and subsequently American economic trends, tend to be significantly more self-centered and personal while European economic trends tend to be more community-based. These differences can best be seen in governmental policy toward taxation and public spending. In the United States, people tend to dislike public spending and taxation while Europeans tend to support higher rates of taxation for spending on the public good. Additionally, when looking at how American cities look vs European cities, this divergent ideology around public vs private living and responsibility is extremely clear. Look at how Americans have embraced suburbia as a major way of living. With suburbia comes single-family homes, private cars, and massive supermarkets. All entities that prioritize and enable hyper-individualized (and often redundant) consumption. American living is epitomized by urban sprawl, where cities have grown outwards rather than upwards. Various American governmental policies have enabled and encouraged urban sprawl. For example, President Eisenhower implemented the Federal Aid Highway Act in 1956 and paved the way for a substantial highway system to be implemented across the nation. These highways, coupled with the uniquely American ability at the time for the average family to afford a car, provided the necessary infrastructure to accelerate and accommodate a massive shift into the suburbs. In the suburbs, families could have their own private single-family house, a backyard, and personal appliances such as refrigerators, dishwashers, and laundry machines. This focus on personal single-family homes led to this very individualistic and socially repetitive pattern of consumption in the United States. 

Conversely, Europe embraced a more collectivist community-based approach to living that does not necessitate the same level of hyper-consumption. Europe has a much higher population density prioritizing multi-family units. This polar opposite urban planning allowed most European cities to subside off less consumption per capita. Whereas in America, strict urban planning restrictions limited who could live where and where businesses could be, in Europe, there was a much more lenient system that allowed for and encouraged a much higher population density.

Consumer Culture 
One major area of research within the sociology of consumption is the study of consumer culture. This includes analyzing the ways in which consumer goods and services are marketed, consumed, and integrated into social identities and cultural practices. Scholars in this area have examined the role of advertising, branding, and other forms of commercial communication in shaping consumer desires and preferences.

Consumer Culture Theory (CCT) maintains that consumption practices contribute to the creation and maintenance of an identity, contrary to Bourdieu’s theory that one’s consumption patterns are rooted in their upbringing and environment. Consumption through the lens of CCT is not only shaped by external factors (such as socioeconomic status, marketing, and upbringing) but also is rooted in individual agency. However, even though CCT credits individual agency to influence patterns of consumption, it is crucial to note that relationships, networks, and changing societal norms are also sources of influence. CCT also relates to the idea of the “extended self” which is a construction of identity created with external objects. For instance, a fashion blogger may consider their clothes to be an extension of themself. They chose clothes that they liked, bought them (or made them), and wear them to signal their identity. In this way, the “you are what you eat” sentiment can be extended to other things that you consume, whether it be clothes, art, books, computers, etc. 

Sociologist Alan Warde suggests that goods and services can be understood as a form of cultural capital, in which individuals use these products to signal their social status and cultural tastes to others. He argues that the consumption of goods and services is often driven by a desire to participate in particular cultural scenes or communities, and to gain recognition and approval from others within these contexts. In this sense, goods and services are seen as part of a broader system of cultural signifiers, in which individuals use a range of material and symbolic objects to communicate their identity and social position. Warde suggests that the meanings and values associated with particular goods and services can change over time, and that these meanings are often contested and negotiated.

Considering advertisements and branding, Jens Beckert’s Imagined Futures sheds light on the potency of symbolic value. Symbolic value is defined as the value derived from the symbolic meaning of an object. For instance, a stuffed animal from childhood has little physical value (in that the toy itself is not necessarily worth much or do much), but can have high symbolic value to the owner because they have ascribed emotions of comfort and nostalgia to the toy. Advertising and branding has tapped into how consumers value products, and ascribe non-function related meanings to the goods and services. For instance, many dog food commercials symbolize their product to be a lifeforce for pets, keeping them happy and healthy for as long as possible, when in reality pet food is just pet food. Branding in itself can be considered as a construction of symbolic meaning attached to an entity, whether it be a company or a person. For example, Nike as a brand represents perseverance and athletic achievement, especially through their tagline, “just do it,” even though they cannot sell perseverance or athletic success. They sell athletic products, but are successful as a brand because of their advertising with some of the greatest athletes of all time and through imbuing their brand with meaning that permeates through the general public.

See also

 Consumer theory
 Consumerism
 Hypermobility (travel)
 Overconsumption
 Waste

References

Further reading
 
 
 Rey, P; Ritzer, G.(2011) "The Sociology of Consumption", The Wiley-Blackwell Companion to Sociology, pp. 444.
 Stebbins, Robert A. Leisure and Consumption: Common Ground, Separate Worlds. Houndmills, Basingstoke, UK: Palgrave Macmillan, 2009.

Consumption
Sociological terminology